Bengawan Solo is a Singaporean bakery chain. It has 45 outlets islandwide with a factory at 23 Woodlands Link. The bakery is known for making and selling Indonesian style kue, buns, cakes, cookies and mooncakes due to the fact that the owner and founder, Tjendri Anastasia or Anastasia Liew, is an Indonesian who migrated to Singapore from Palembang in early 1970s. 

All products are prepared at the central kitchen in Woodlands and delivered to the stores 2-3 times daily. Pandan cake is the most popular treat in the shop.

History
Bengawan Solo was founded in 1979 by Tjendri Anastasia or Anastasia Tjendri-Liew, who emigrated from Indonesia. Anastasia had initially started an unlicensed home baking business of Indonesian delicacies in her HDB apartment at Marine Terrace before officers from the Singapore Ministry of Environment required her to either to close or officiate her business. Bengawan Solo is named after the Indonesian song and river of the same name.

References

External links
 Official website

Bakeries of Singapore
Singaporean brands